The 2013 Essendon Football Club season is the club's 115th season in the Australian Football League (AFL).

This season also represents the first time since 2002 that the club will independently compete with a reserves team in the Victorian Football League (VFL).

Supplements controversy 

On 5 February the Essendon Football Club asked Australian Sports Anti-Doping Authority (ASADA) to investigate the concerns over the clubs possible use of un-approved supplements during the 2012 season.
An Independent review conducted by Ziggy Switkowski regarding the Essendon Football Club governance processes was released to the public on 6 May.
CEO Ian Robson hands in his resignation on 23 May. He is replaced by former Tatts Group CEO and Essendon board member Ray Gunston as the interim CEO.
Chairman David Evans resigns citing health issues on 27 July. Former Toll Holdings Managing Director and Essendon board member Paul Little is elected to replace him as the new Essendon Chairman.
On 27 August, the AFL charged the Essendon Football Club with breaking "Rule 1.6 - engaging in conduct that is unbecoming or likely to prejudice the interests or reputation of the Australian Football League or to bring the game of football into disrepute". There have been no player sanctions from ASADA, whose investigation is still ongoing.

The following charges were handed down against club and personnel: 
 $2,000,000 fine
 Club forfeits place in finals and deemed to have finished 9th
 Loss of First and Second Round draft selections in 2013 and 2014 draft
 Club receives end of First Round selection in 2014 draft
 James Hird, Head Coach - 12-month suspension (backdated to 25 August 2013)
 Danny Corcoran, Football Manager - 6-month suspension (two months of which is suspended for a period of two years)
 Mark Thompson, Senior Assistant - $30,000 fine
 Bruce Reid, Club Doctor  - charges dropped

Squad

Trades

In

Out

Drafts

National Draft

Rookie Draft

Pre-Season Draft

Delisted

Results

Pre-season (NAB Cup)

Round 1
 The three teams in each pool play each other in games of two 20 minute halves, with all three games being played over a three-hour period at the one venue.

Round 2

Round 3

Home and Away season

Round 1

Round 2

Round 3

Round 4

Round 5

Round 6

Round 7

Round 8

Round 9

Round 10

Round 11

Round 12

Round 13
Bye

Round 14

Round 15

Round 16

Round 17

Round 18

Round 19

Round 20

Round 21

Round 22

Round 23

Ladder

Ladder progress

Tribunal cases

Season Statistics

Home attendance

Awards

Brownlow Medal

Crichton Medal

Other Awards

Season Financials

EFC Annual Report 2013

Notes
"Points" refers to carry-over points accrued following the sanction. For example, 154.69 points draw a one-match suspension, with 54.69 carry-over points (for every 100 points, a one-match suspension is given).
Son of Anthony Daniher (118 Games).
Restricted Free agent
Denotes amount of seasons on the  list only.
Home game.
Away game.
 Relegated to 9th place due to AFL Sanctions

References

External links
 Official website of the Essendon Football Club
 Official website of the Australian Football League 
 2013 Season scores and results at AFL Tables
 2013 Essendon player statistics at AFL Tables

2013
Essendon Football Club